HMAS Strahan (J363/M363), named for the town of Strahan, Tasmania, was one of 60 Bathurst-class corvettes constructed during World War II, and one of 36 initially manned and commissioned solely by the Royal Australian Navy (RAN).

Design and construction

In 1938, the Australian Commonwealth Naval Board (ACNB) identified the need for a general purpose 'local defence vessel' capable of both anti-submarine and mine-warfare duties, while easy to construct and operate. Construction of the prototype  did not go ahead, but the plans were retained. The need for locally built 'all-rounder' vessels at the start of World War II saw the "Australian Minesweepers" (designated as such to hide their anti-submarine capability, but popularly referred to as "corvettes") approved in September 1939, with 60 constructed during the course of the war: 36 (including Strahan) ordered by the RAN, 20 ordered by the British Admiralty but manned and commissioned as RAN vessels, and 4 for the Royal Indian Navy.

Strahan was laid down by the State Dockyard at Newcastle, New South Wales on 9 October 1942. She was launched on 12 July 1943 by Mrs. J. J. Cahill, wife of the Minister for Public Works and Local Government, and commissioned into the RAN on 14 March 1944.

Operational history
Strahan began her career in May 1944, arriving in New Guinea after completing trials to serve as an escort and anti-submarine vessel. In October 1944, Strahan was present in Morotai Harbour when the recently captured island was attacked by Japanese aircraft. The corvette was attacked by a dive-bomber, but was able to drive off the Japanese plane before she was damaged. The aircraft was then destroyed by an American Bofors shore installation, but there claims that Strahans 4-inch gun had seriously damaged the aircraft, and that it was in an uncontrollable dive when the Bofors blew it up.

In May 1945, Strahan travelled to Adelaide via Sydney, where she underwent a refit. Following this, she was immediate deployed back in New Guinea, and in June 1945 fired upon Japanese gun emplacements on Kairiru Island. In August, the corvette sank a Japanese supply craft off Tarakan, and captured three survivors.

Following the end of World War II, Strahan was assigned to the 21st Minesweeping Flotilla in Hong Kong, and performed in minesweeping and anti-piracy patrols. On 26 September, an acoustic mine detonated under Strahans stern while the corvette was pursuing Chinese pirates. Her rudder was damaged, and she had to be towed into Hong Kong Harbour by sister ship . She was repaired, and returned to Australia. In November, Strahan visited her namesake town. During the visit, a leading seaman drowned; the only casualty in the ship's life. Strahan was decommissioned into reserve in Sydney on 25 January 1946, having sailed almost  in her two-year career.

The corvette received two battle honours for her wartime service: "Pacific 1944–45" and "New Guinea 1944".

Fate
Strahan was sold to the Kinoshita Australia company for scrap on 6 January 1961. She was broken up at Green Point in Sydney during March 1963.

Citations

References
Books

Journal and news articles

External links

Bathurst-class corvettes of the Royal Australian Navy
Ships built in New South Wales
1943 ships
World War II corvettes of Australia